Lilian Onyango Awuor (born 13 June 1999) is a professional Kenyan footballer who plays for Division 1 Féminine side ASJ Soyaux-Charente. She is currently playing for Vihiga Queens and the Harambee Starlets, the Kenya Women's National Football Team.

International career 
She represented Kenya at the 2016 Africa Women Cup of Nations and was one of the back-up goalkeepers to Samantha Akinyi. She made her debut for the team in a 2022 African Cup of Nations qualifiers against South Sudan.

See also
List of Kenya women's international footballers

References

External links 

 
 

Kenya women's international footballers
1999 births
Living people
Kenyan women's footballers
Women's association football goalkeepers
ASJ Soyaux-Charente players
Kenyan expatriate sportspeople in France
Kenyan expatriate footballers
Expatriate women's footballers in France